The King David School, of Birmingham, England was founded in 1843 as the Birmingham Hebrew School, an infants and primary Jewish day school. Students learn Hebrew, eat kosher food, recite Jewish prayers, and celebrate Israeli holidays.

The school is unique for its multicultural intake and atmosphere. In the late 1950s, the declining local Jewish population led the school to accept non-Jewish students, most of whom were Muslim due to the changing demographics. As a result, in 2007 about half of the school's 247 students were reportedly Muslim, with less than 40% Jewish. An article in The Independent praised the school's ethos and its efforts in promoting inter-faith harmony from such a young age.

References

External links
King David School, Birmingham, England

Jewish day schools
Jewish schools in England
Voluntary aided schools in England
Primary schools in Birmingham, West Midlands
Educational institutions established in 1865
1856 establishments in England